Woodside is an unincorporated middle income urban locality of Dartmouth, within the Halifax Regional Municipality, Nova Scotia. The community is divided into North Woodside and South Woodside. Woodside is home to two hospitals: the Dartmouth General Hospital and the Nova Scotia Hospital.

History 
Woodside originally referred to the rural estate of John E. Fairbanks in 1830. Around this time, Henry Mott ran a brickyard and a chocolate factory in the area. The area began to expand in 1858 with the construction of the Nova Scotia Hospital, and then again in 1884 following the construction of a sugar refinery. In 1917, the Imperial Oil Refinery was built, leading to further growth. In 1921, Immaculate Conception Roman Catholic Church and St. Alban's Anglican Church were built on hospital land. The following year, Woodside-Imperoyal Presbyterian Church was established. Because the local economy was driven by the refineries, Woodside was predominantly a working class community. There was at one point consideration to incorporate Woodside as a town, but the idea was rejected by the provincial government.

Geography

Woodside is divided into two areas; North Woodside and South Woodside.

Businesses

Several businesses reside within the boundaries of Woodside. These include the Dartmouth Refinery, the Irving Oil terminal, and an offshore industrial park called the Woodside Industrial Park. In the Business Park businesses include Aecon Fabco. Another institution is InNOVAcorp, formerly the Nova Scotia Research Foundation.

Development
A new development called Russell Lake West is planned for both single family and multiple family dwellings. On the grounds next to the Nova Scotia Hospital, the NSCC Ivany Campus has been built. Also a new shopping mall, Dartmouth Gate, is under development at the site of the former Hershey Moirs chocolate factory.

Schools

Current 
South Woodside Elementary School
Dartmouth South Academy

Previous 

 Southdale-North Woodside Elementary School
 Prince Arthur Junior High School

Notable places
Woodside Atlantic Wharf
North Woodside Community Centre
NSCC Ivany Campus
Dartmouth Gate

References

External links
The Miracle of Woodside 4 June 1965
NSCC Dartmouth Campus

Communities in Halifax, Nova Scotia
Dartmouth, Nova Scotia